Bearcats! is an American Western television series broadcast on the CBS television network during the fall 1971 television season. It starred Rod Taylor and Dennis Cole as troubleshooters in the period before the American entry into World War I (1917).

Bearcats! was produced by Filmways Inc. (which previously produced many series including The Addams Family, Mister Ed, The Beverly Hillbillies, Green Acres, and Petticoat Junction). It was co-produced by Rodlor, Rod Taylor's production firm.

Synopsis
Set in 1914, somewhat later historically than a traditional Western, the stories center on the heroes' use of a 1914 Stutz Bearcat automobile. Although automobiles were common in the United States in 1914, a $2,000 sports car would have been very rare in the more remote areas of the Western United States. How the heroes paid for this expensive ride was rather unusual, as well. They undertook work which could be considered "private security" for a prosperous clientele, and rather than charging a traditional fee, they extracted from the client a blank check, with the amount charged to be determined by just how difficult or dangerous the job proved to be once it was completed. "If you can put a price on it, you don't need them badly enough." Typical adventures included learning who was setting fire to oil wells, unraveling a plot where German Deutsches Heer soldiers dressed as American troops raided Mexican border towns hoping to force Mexico into a war with the United States, and stopping mercenaries from sabotaging medical supplies being sent overseas to the Allies of World War I.

Its time period also allowed the use of props not usually seen in typical westerns, including airplanes, a World War I-era tank, machine guns, M1911 pistols, and a number of period automobiles.

Cast
Rod Taylor as Hank Brackett
Dennis Cole as Johnny Reach

Production
The series was created by veteran TV writer/producer Douglas Heyes who also served as executive producer. He wrote and directed the TV movie Powderkeg that served as the pilot film for the series. Episodes were shot on location in near Tucson, Arizona, and also in and around Santa Fe, New Mexico. Powderkeg was syndicated in the 1970s and frequently aired by local U.S. TV stations, and was the only episode of the series to be released as a VHS videotape.

The series featured a number of well-known guest stars including Leslie Nielsen, Kevin McCarthy, Jane Merrow, Keenan Wynn, Henry Darrow, David Canary, Ed Flanders, Morgan Woodward, and Eric Braeden.

For filming, the series used two full-scale metal replicas of first generation (1912–1916) Stutz Bearcats made by Hollywood car customizer and film car builder George Barris. While externally very close to the original cars, in fact they were built on custom chassis powered by Ford drivetrains and had modern four wheel brake systems for safety. The two replicas were very similar to one another, however the first built (and the one used for most filming) had a manual 4-speed transmission while the second had an automatic. Additionally, there was a slight variation in the location of the horn bulb and the pinstripes on the sides of the hood of the second car, so the cars can be differentiated while closely viewing the episodes. In addition to the two cars used in the series, Barris built and retained a third car for use at car shows which differed in many details and color from the TV cars. All three cars survive today, though Barris' display car has been extensively modified. The original Stutz Bearcat automobiles had been manufactured in Indianapolis, Indiana; the Stutz factory building still exists but is currently used as an arts and office complex.

The episode "Groundloop at Spanish Wells" features a 1918 Standard J-1 airplane (though it's called a Curtiss Jenny in the script) that had recently been restored in Tucson (where the episode was filmed) by Charles Klessig of Fargo, North Dakota. A later episode featuring the same pilot character, "The Return of Esteban", featured a 1929 British de Havilland DH.60 Moth biplane. According to Klessig, the episode was filmed in New Mexico where the higher altitudes precluded the use of the older aircraft.

The World War I tank shown in the episode "The Devil Wears Armor" is an M1917 (aka Six Ton) tank, an American-built version of the Renault FT. Its gun is not authentic. The M1917 was first ordered in 1917, and the first example was produced in late 1918, four years later than the series' 1914 setting.

The MPC (Model Products Corporation) model company released a 1/25th scale model kit of a Stutz Bearcat as a tie-in with the series. Its box art featured Taylor and Cole in costume with the genuine 1914 Bearcat used in Powderkeg. A photo on the side of the box showed the first Barris replica in a scene from the episode "The Devil Wears Armor".

Cancellation
Bearcats!, despite a large promotional campaign prior to its premiere and having a loyal fan base, lost in the Nielsen ratings to both The Flip Wilson Show on NBC and a more traditional Western, Alias Smith and Jones, on ABC, and was cancelled midseason.

Episodes

Broadcasts
The series was shown extensively overseas, including Germany, Ireland, the United Kingdom, and Australia. Its pilot film, Powderkeg, was released as a theatrical feature overseas.

Home media
On May 14, 2013, Timeless Media Group released Bearcats! – The Complete Series in a three-DVD set in Region 1.  The 90-minute pilot episode "Powderkeg" is not included, but was released as a standalone DVD or as part of the "20 Great Westerns: Heroes and Bandits" DVD box set produced by TGG Direct.

Original novel based on the series
When the series was announced, paperback publisher Award Books licensed book rights to Bearcats! and commissioned an original novel by veteran Western novelist W.T. Ballard, to be published in 1971, under his tie-in pseudonym "Brian Fox" (a by-line he had employed often when working for Award).  But when the TV series was canceled before the book could be made ready for distribution, the book was canceled in turn. Ballard, apparently unwilling to let the novel go unpublished, retitled it, slapped on another of his pseudonyms, and, without so much as changing the names of its heroes, sold the book again to unsuspecting publisher Ballantine Books—who released it in December, 1972 under the title Hell Hole as by "John Hunter."  The connection was not discovered during Ballard's lifetime.

References

Other sources
 Brooks, Tim and Marsh, Earle, The Complete Directory to Prime Time Network and Cable TV Shows
 "Still Hitting on All Four". Author not listed. TV Guide, September 18, 1971.
 Heyes, Douglas, Bearcats! - The Complete Television Series, Timeless Media Group, UPC 011301675767, 14 May 2013.

External links
  (Pilot)
 
 Bearcats! at the Internet Movie Cars Database
 Page on the series at the Rod Taylor site
 

1971 American television series debuts
1971 American television series endings
Fiction set in 1914
CBS original programming
English-language television shows
Television series set in the 1910s
Television series by MGM Television
1970s Western (genre) television series
World War I television series
Television shows filmed in Arizona
Television shows filmed in New Mexico
Television series by Filmways